Wang Beiming (born 13 August 1983 in Shanghai) is a male Chinese water polo player. He was part of the gold medal winning team at the 2006 Asian Games. He also competed at the 2008 Summer Olympics.

References
 profile

1983 births
Living people
Chinese male water polo players
Olympic water polo players of China
Sportspeople from Shanghai
Water polo players at the 2008 Summer Olympics
Asian Games medalists in water polo
Water polo players at the 2010 Asian Games
Medalists at the 2010 Asian Games
Asian Games silver medalists for China
21st-century Chinese people